Nadia Reisenberg Sherman (14 July 1904 – 10 June 1983) was an American pianist of Lithuanian birth.

Biography

Nadia Reisenberg was born in Vilnius to a Jewish family. Her parents were Aaron and Rachel Reisenberg. Her sister Anna (Newta) was born two years later, and Clara in 1911 who later took the married name of Clara Rockmore and became renowned for her virtuosity on the theremin. The three sisters remained extremely close. When Nadia was six, her uncle Paul sent the family a piano, and Nadia immediately knew she would be at the keyboard for the rest of her life. Her talent demanded that the family move to St. Petersburg for study at the Conservatory, where the director, famed composer Alexander Glazunov, took a special interest in the gifted girl. She studied under Leonid Nikolayev at the Saint Petersburg Conservatory. Due to the upheavals of the October Revolution, she and her family returned to Vilnius, then traveled to Warsaw and Germany. They finally settled in New York in 1922.

Her son, Robert Sherman, teaches courses on "The Business of Music" at Juilliard and previously wrote music criticism for The New York Times for four decades.

Death
Reisenberg died in 1983 at the age of 78 in New York City.

Music career
Reisenberg gave concerts in the 1920s, particularly with her sister Clara Rockmore, but in 1930 went to study again and chose Josef Hofmann as a tutor. Reisenberg's most important concert activity took place in the 1940s. She was especially praised for her series of concerts encompassing all the piano concertos by Mozart, played (with Alfred Wallenstein conducting) for WOR, which was broadcast in the 1939/40 season. These concerts "made radio history".

Reisenberg continued to perform until the end of her life, and appeared at Carnegie Hall a total of 22 times. While she usually appeared as a soloist with the New York Philharmonic, she gave two recitals at the venue: an all-Tchaikovsky program on 13 November 1943, in commemoration of the 50th anniversary of the composer's death, and another of unknown repertoire on 21 November 1947. From 1955-1983, Reisenberg was a member of the piano faculty of the Mannes School of Musici. In later years, Reisenberg taught at the Juilliard School and was a frequent juror for the Leventritt Competition.

Legacy
Reisenberg's sons co-authored a biography on their mother, Nadia Reisenberg: A Musician's Scrapbook (1985). Since 2002, the Nadia Reisenberg Recital Award sponsored by The Nadia Reisenberg & Clara Rockmore Foundation takes place every two years at the Mannes School of Music in New York City.

References

External links 
 Nadia Reisenberg Collection at the International Piano Archives at Maryland
 The Nadia Reisenberg & Clara Rockmore Foundation
 "Chopin helps Nadia Reisenberg, a forgotten pianist, come back to life" by Anthony Tommasini, The New York Times (5 January 2009)
 , Piano Sonata No. 52

1904 births
1983 deaths
20th-century classical pianists
American classical pianists
American women classical pianists
American people of Lithuanian-Jewish descent
Juilliard School faculty
Lithuanian Jews
Musicians from New York City
Piano pedagogues
Jewish classical pianists
20th-century American pianists
20th-century American women pianists
Educators from New York City
American women educators
Classical musicians from New York (state)
Women music educators
Lithuanian emigrants to the United States